Alcoa World Alumina and Chemicals is a joint venture between Alumina Limited (40% share) and Alcoa (60% share) and is abbreviated to AWAC. AWAC's business is the mining of bauxite, the extraction of alumina (aluminium oxide) and the smelting of aluminium. It has about 25% of the global alumina market. Alcoa acts as the day-to-day manager.

Australian operations
Alcoa has two smelters in Victoria, located at Portland and Point Henry in Victoria. It has three alumina refineries in Western Australia, located at Kwinana Beach, Pinjarra and Wagerup, and two bauxite mines at Huntly and Willowdale, also in Western Australia.

Portland smelter

The Portland smelter produces about 360,000 tonnes of aluminium a year, and is Victoria's largest single exporter.

Point Henry smelter

The Point Henry smelter commenced full production on April 4, 1963. It has a production capacity of 185,000 tonnes of aluminium a year. March 20, 1969, saw Alcoa's own brown coal-fired Anglesea Power Station brought on line at augment the electricity supply from the Victorian grid.
The Point Henry smelter closed in 2014.

Other operations 
AWAC has other operations in Brazil, Guinea, Jamaica, Suriname, Spain, and the USA

See also
 Alumina
 Aluminium smelting
 Alcoa
 Alumina Limited
 Australian Aluminium Council
 List of Alumina Refineries
 List of aluminium smelters
 AWAC webpage

References

Aluminium smelters
Aluminium companies of Australia
Alcoa
Joint ventures
Manufacturing companies of Australia